Syntaxin-8 is a protein that in humans is encoded by the STX8 gene.
Syntaxin 8 directly interacts with HECTd3 and has similar subcellular localization. The protein has been shown to form the SNARE complex with syntaxin 7, vti1b and endobrevin. These function as the machinery for the homotypic fusion of late endosomes.

Model organisms				

Model organisms have been used in the study of STX8 function. A conditional knockout mouse line, called Stx8tm2a(EUCOMM)Wtsi was generated as part of the International Knockout Mouse Consortium program—a high-throughput mutagenesis project to generate and distribute animal models of disease to interested scientists—at the Wellcome Trust Sanger Institute. Male and female animals underwent a standardized phenotypic screen to determine the effects of deletion. Twenty four tests were carried out on homozygous mutant adult mice, however no significant abnormalities were observed.

Interactions 

STX8 has been shown to interact with Vesicle-associated membrane protein 8, VTI1B and STX7.

References

Further reading 

 
 
 
 
 
 
 
 
 
 
 
 
 
 

Genes mutated in mice